André Mayamba Mabuti Kathongo (1931 – 12 April 2016) was a Democratic Republic of the Congo, Roman Catholic bishop.

Ordained to the priesthood in 1958, Mayamba Mabuti Kathongo served as bishop of the Roman Catholic Diocese of Popokabaka, Democratic Republic of the Congo from 1979 until 1993.

See also

Notes

1931 births
2016 deaths
20th-century Roman Catholic bishops in the Democratic Republic of the Congo
Roman Catholic bishops of Popokabaka
21st-century Democratic Republic of the Congo people